Tugimaantee 63 (ofcl. abbr. T63), also called the Karisilla–Petseri highway, is a 17.8-kilometre-long national basic road in southeastern Estonia. The highway begins at Karisilla on national road 45 and ends at the Koidula border crossing on the Russian border north of Pechory.

See also
 Transport in Estonia

References

External links

N63